La Higuera is a small village in Bolivia located in the Province of Vallegrande, in the Department of Santa Cruz. It is situated in the La Higuera Canton (civil parish) belonging to the Pucará Municipality.

Geography
The village is situated some 150 km (bee-line) southwest of Santa Cruz de la Sierra and 15 southwest of Pucará. La Higuera lies at an elevation of 1950 m. Its population (according to the 2001 census) is 119, mainly indigenous Guaraní people.

History

On October 8, 1967, the Argentine Marxist revolutionary Che Guevara was captured by the CIA-assisted Bolivian Army in the nearby ravine Quebrada del Churo, ending his campaign to create a continental revolution in South America. Che Guevara was held in the schoolhouse, where he was killed the next day. The body was then brought to Vallegrande, where it was placed on display and afterwards secretly buried under an airstrip.

Che tourism

A monument to "El Che" and a memorial in the former schoolhouse are the major tourist attraction for this area. La Higuera is a stop on the "Ruta del Che" (Che Guevara Trail) which was inaugurated in 2004.

References

External links

 Che Guevara Legacy Lives on in Bolivia BBC News, August 24, 2004
 Bolivian Town Recalls Che Assassination Prensa Latina, October 8, 2008
 Che Sat Here: The Making (and Marketing) of a Martyr by Alex Ayala Ugarte, Virginia Quarterly Review, Winter 2009 Issue
 Che Guevara's 81st birthday Marked in Bolivia Ahora, June 15, 2009

Populated places in Santa Cruz Department (Bolivia)
Che Guevara